Sleepovers is a 2001 children's novel by the English writer Jacqueline Wilson, illustrated by Nick Sharratt.

Plot
The story is about a girl called Daisy and her friends at her new school (in alphabetical order): Amy, Bella, Chloe, Daisy, and Emily (aka The Alphabet Girls). Each girl has their birthday coming up consecutively (in order - Amy, Bella, Emily, Chloe and Daisy), and they all decide that a sleepover party would be a good idea. All the girls are very nice; Chloe however is very spoiled and starts to boss everyone into her ideas and especially torment Daisy. This then enables a sudden fear that Lily (Daisy's disabled 11-year-old sister) would trigger further torment from Chloe.

At Amy's girly sleepover they enjoy lots of dancing, singing, painting their nails together and having a midnight feast. Daisy helps Emily who gets sick and wishes Emily could be her best friend despite that Emily is Chloe's. For Bella's sleepover she takes them all swimming, and they all have fun. They then have a huge tea at Bella's and a blue birthday cake in the shape of a swimming pool. Bella's parents sleep in the spare room and allows the girls to all sleep in their big double bed together.

For Emily's sleepover they all go to the park for a picnic (including playing football whilst Emily's mother gets the picnic together and again at the park).  On arrival at the park, Chloe pushes Daisy out of the car on account of Emily's idea of bringing hers and Daisy's teddy bears to the picnic and singing the song The Teddy Bears' Picnic en-route with the others, causing Daisy to scrape her knees and Chloe lied that it was an accident. Emily kindly lets Daisy share her bed and their friendship grows.

Chloe tries to not invite Daisy to her sleepover party by falsely claiming "her Mum won't let her have four invites", but Emily, Amy and Bella refuse to come unless Daisy comes too, causing an argument between them. In the end Chloe gives in and lets Daisy come. At Chloe's party they make pizzas but Chloe sabotages Daisy's pizza by covering it with anchovies which Daisy hates - she then says that they'll make sure Daisy's piece of birthday cake has a special anchovy filling when it comes to cake time, which causes Daisy to decline to eat any. They then watch very scary horror movies which causes Daisy to stay awake all night in fear.

Daisy is afraid of having a sleepover party herself as she fears the girls will be uncomfortable about her sister Lily. She tells her Dad about Chloe and he suggests not inviting her but her Mum insists it's only fair since Daisy went to Chloe's. Daisy's mum then said Chloe had automatically been invited after her mum phoned out of concern after the sleepover because Daisy didn't eat anything and then Daisy's mum told her she would be having a sleepover party herself. When Amy, Bella and Emily meet Lily they are very understanding and kind about her. Chloe is very gloomy and rude when they all play party games together with Daisy's Dad. The girls all sleep in a big tent in the garden and have a lot of fun. Chloe wakes Daisy in the middle of the night to take her to the loo. When they get upstairs, Lily, who is awake, wails loudly upon hearing them and scares Chloe, causing her to wet herself and she decides to return home that night.

When the girls see Chloe again back at school she tells rumours about Lily being a maniac baby. Emily, Amy and Bella stand up for Daisy and Lily and claim that Chloe is the baby (a reference to the wetting incident). Chloe angrily breaks up with them and goes off with another gang of girls. From then on, the girls go around as a foursome and Emily becomes Daisy's best friend.

Characters 
Daisy The main character of the story and a very nice girl who is quite new to the school and likes art. She creates "The Alphabet Girls" for the girls. She is also protective of her disabled sister Lily. 
Amy A sweet girl who loves to perform dances and apply make up.
Bella A very fun girl who loves chocolate and cake. She never ever feels sick even when she eats so much.
Chloe The main antagonist who is spoiled by her proud parents. She is a cruel, bossy bully who thinks she can have anything she wants. She takes a dislike to Daisy and constantly torments her, calling her "Daisy Diddums."
Emily A polite girl who loves football. She was originally Chloe's best friend, but grows closer to Daisy throughout the story.
Lily Lily is Daisy's older sister whose brain was damaged when she was born and unable to walk or talk. Lily's starting attendance at a new special school prompted Daisy to start at the new school; it is established that the girls' family moved away so Lily could attend. Despite Daisy feeling initially resentful towards her, she genuinely loves Lily and cares greatly for her. Lily has a fear of teddy bears
Ben Emily's baby brother who Daisy becomes very fond of.
Alison Amy's eldest sister.
Abigail Amy's second eldest sister.

References 

2001 British novels
British children's novels
Novels by Jacqueline Wilson
2001 children's books
Disability in fiction
Doubleday (publisher) books